Koonan is a town in the far west of Ivory Coast. It is a sub-prefecture and commune of Ouaninou Department in Bafing Region, Woroba District.
In 2014, the population of the sub-prefecture of Koonan was 6,553.

Villages
The fifteen villages of the sub-prefecture of Koonan and their population in 2014 are:

Notes

Sub-prefectures of Bafing Region
Communes of Bafing Region